Rhodes Point is an unincorporated community located on Smith Island in Somerset County, Maryland, United States. Rhodes Point lies on the same insular mass as does the main Smith Island town of Ewell.  A number of canal-like waterways separate the two communities but bridges and a road connect them.

References

Crabbing communities in Maryland
Fishing communities in Maryland
Unincorporated communities in Somerset County, Maryland
Smith Island, Maryland
Unincorporated communities in Maryland